The Province of the Cape of Good Hope, commonly referred to as the Cape Province and colloquially as The Cape, was a province in the Union of South Africa and subsequently the Republic of South Africa. It encompassed the old Cape Colony, as well as Walvis Bay, and had Cape Town as its capital. In 1994, the Cape Province was divided into the new Eastern Cape, Northern Cape and Western Cape provinces, along with part of the North West.

History
When the Union of South Africa was formed in 1910, the original Cape Colony was renamed the Cape Province.

It was by far the largest of South Africa's four provinces, as it contained regions it had previously annexed, such as British Bechuanaland (not to be confused with the Bechuanaland Protectorate, now Botswana), Griqualand East (the area around Kokstad) and Griqualand West (area around Kimberley).

At the time of the formation of the Union of South Africa, South Africa consisted of four provinces: Transvaal (previously the South African Republic), Natal, Orange Free State and the Cape Province.

Cape Franchise

Before union, the Cape Colony had traditionally implemented a system of non-racial franchise, whereby qualifications for suffrage were applied equally to all males, regardless of race. During the union negotiations, the Cape Prime Minister, John X. Merriman fought unsuccessfully to extend this multi-racial franchise system to the rest of South Africa. This failed, as it was strongly opposed by the other constituent states which were determined to entrench white rule. 
After union, the Cape Province was permitted to keep a restricted version of its multi-racial qualified franchise, and thus became the only province where Coloureds (mixed-race people) and Black Africans could vote.

Over the following years, successive acts were passed to erode this colour-blind voters roll. 
In 1931, the restricting franchise qualifications were removed for white voters, but kept for Black and Coloured voters. In 1956, the Apartheid government removed all remaining suffrage rights for "non-whites". The government had to appoint many extra senators in parliament to force through this change.

Partitioning under Apartheid
During the apartheid era, so-called "bantustans" or homelands for the different Bantu nations were carved out of the existing provinces as part of the policy of perpetuating white control over South Africa. These became known as the four independent TBVC States and the six Non-Independent Homelands.

In the Cape Province, the Transkei (1976) and Ciskei (1981) regions were declared independent of South Africa.  Griqualand East was transferred to Natal Province after Transkei was declared independent, since it was cut off from the rest of the province.  With the 1994 adoption of the Interim Constitution, these homelands were re-incorporated into South Africa, both part of the new Eastern Cape province.

Post-apartheid
After the first fully democratic elections in April 1994, the Transkei and Ciskei bantustans were reunited with Cape Province, then the country was divided into what are now the current nine provinces of South Africa. Cape Province was broken up into three smaller provinces: the Western Cape, Eastern Cape and Northern Cape. Parts of it were also absorbed into the North West. Walvis Bay, a territory of the original Cape Colony, had been ceded to Namibia two months earlier.

Districts in 1991
Districts of the province and population at the 1991 census. 

 Aberdeen: 8,009
 Adelaide: 15,220
 Albany (main town Grahamstown): 69,705
 Albert (main town Burgersdorp): 16,995
 Alexandria: 26,651
 Aliwal-Noord: 27,486
 Barkly-Oos: 12,821
 Barkly-Wes: 35,012
 Bathurst: 32,419
 Beaufort-Wes: 31,726
 Bedford: 16,074
 Bellville: 269,995
 Bredasdorp: 23,076
 Britstown: 6,523
 Caledon: 79,052
 Calitzdorp: 6,759
 Calvinia: 18,430
 Cape: 179,537
 Carnarvon: 9,728
 Cathcart: 14,815
 Ceres: 47,052
 Clanwilliam: 28,144
 Colesberg: 15,446
 Cradock: 37,144
 De Aar: 25,438
 Oos-Londen: 240,474
 Elliot: 14,159
 Fort Beaufort: 22,793
 Fraserburg: 4,367
 George: 95,597
 Goodwood: 259,620
 Gordonia (main town Upington): 118,623
 Graaff-Reinet: 34,440
 Hankey: 24,548
 Hanover: 4,399
 Hartswater: 29,146
 Hay (main town Griquatown): 11,104
 Heidelberg: 11,519
 Herbert (main town Douglas): 26,316
 Hermanus: 21,610
 Hofmeyr: 4,995
 Hopefield: 8,822
 Hopetown: 11,175
 Humansdorp: 43,799
 Indwe: 9,483
 Jansenville: 9,797
 Joubertina: 13,385
 Kenhardt: 11,353
 Kimberley: 167,060
 King William's Town: 29,653
 Kirkwood: 30,766
 Knysna: 50,420
 Komga: 14,142
 Kuilsrivier: 133,577
 Kuruman: 24,817
 Ladismith: 12,705
 Lady Grey: 7,530
 Laingsburg: 5,781
 Maclear: 16,653
 Malmesbury: 113,450
 Middelburg: 21,737
 Molteno: 11,702
 Montagu: 21,674
 Moorreesburg: 11,159
 Mosselbaai: 59,170
 Murraysburg: 5,960
 Namakwaland (main town Springbok): 62,536
 Noupoort: 8,348
 Oudtshoorn: 68,093
 Paarl: 136,121
 Pearston: 4,983
 Philipstown: 8,799
 Piketberg: 34,152
 Port Elizabeth: 670,653
 Postmasburg: 54,790
 Prieska: 19,185
 Prince Albert: 8,567
 Queenstown: 44,469
 Richmond: 6,326
 Riversdal: 25,021
 Robertson: 32,331
 Simonstad: 58,323
 Somerset-Oos: 29,758
 Somerset-Wes: 59,947
 Stellenbosch: 73,839
 Sterkstroom: 7,687
 Steynsburg: 10,593
 Steytlerville: 5,341
 Strand: 40,096
 Stutterheim: 40,119
 Sutherland: 3,596
 Swellendam: 32,147
 Tarka: 9,538
 Tulbagh: 25,334
 Uitenhage: 182,551
 Uniondale: 9,354
 Vanrhynsdorp: 12,815
 Venterstad: 5,777
 Victoria West: 11,910
 Vredenburg: 39,908
 Vredendal: 28,962
 Vryburg: 98,551
 Walvisbaai (South African 1878–1994): 22,999
 Warrenton: 22,368
 Wellington: 37,432
 Williston: 4,177
 Willowmore: 10,734
 Wodehouse (main town Dordrecht): 15,540
 Worcester: 117,159
 Wynberg: 1,101,668

Administrators

See also 
 Provinces of South Africa

References

External links
A history of the Cape Province
Archives kept at Cape Town
 
 

History of South Africa
Former provinces of South Africa
States and territories established in 1910
States and territories disestablished in 1994
1910 establishments in South Africa
1994 disestablishments in South Africa